Gilbert Van Binst (born 5 July 1951 in Machelen) is a former Belgian football player who played as a defender.

Club career
He played for over a decade for Anderlecht, beginning his professional career with the club in 1968. He won numerous domestic and continental honours during his time with the club, most famously scoring two goals in the win over Austria Wien in the 1978 European Cup Winners' Cup Final. He would move to France to play for Toulouse FC for one season in 1980. He returned to Belgium in 1981, finishing his career by playing for Anderlecht's city rivals Club Brugge.

International career
Van Binst earned 15 caps for Belgium. He was a part of the squad that finished third at the 1972 European Championships on home soil.

Honours

Club 
RSC Anderlecht

 Belgian First Division: 1971–72, 1973–74
 Belgian Cup: 1971–72, 1972–73, 1974–75, 1975–76 ; 1976-77 (finalists)
 Belgian League Cup: 1973, 1974
European Cup Winners' Cup: 1975–76 (winners), 1976–77 (runners-up), 1977–78 (winners)
 European Super Cup: 1976, 1978
 Inter-Cities Fairs Cup: 1969–70 (runners-up)
 Amsterdam Tournament: 1976
Tournoi de Paris: 1977
 Jules Pappaert Cup: 1977
 Belgian National Sports Merit Award: 1978

Club Brugge 

 Belgian Cup: 1982-83 (finalists)

International 
UEFA European Championship: 1972 (third place)

References

External links
 weltfussball
 

1951 births
Living people
Belgian Pro League players
Belgian footballers
Belgium international footballers
Club Brugge KV players
R.S.C. Anderlecht players
Toulouse FC players
UEFA Euro 1972 players
People from Machelen
Association football defenders
Footballers from Flemish Brabant